Janice Ellen Stead  (born 1 November 1939) is a New Zealand former cricketer who played as a right-handed batter. She appeared in nine Test matches for New Zealand between 1966 and 1972, with a high score of 95, scored against Australia in 1972. She played domestic cricket for Canterbury.

In the 2021 Birthday Honours, Stead was appointed a Member of the New Zealand Order of Merit, for services to sport and the community.

References

External links
 

1939 births
Living people
Cricketers from Christchurch
New Zealand women cricketers
New Zealand women Test cricketers
Canterbury Magicians cricketers
Members of the New Zealand Order of Merit